Duško Tomić (14 August 1958 – 22 April 2017) is a Serbian football coach and former professional goalkeeper.

Born in Ruma, as a goalkeeper he defended for a number of clubs in the Yugoslav First League.

On 22 April 2017, Tomić died of acute leukemia, aged 58.

References 

1958 births
2017 deaths
Serbian footballers
Yugoslav footballers
Association football goalkeepers
KF Besa players
NK Rudar Velenje players
FK Teteks players
FK Trepča players
FK Radnički Niš players
OFK Kikinda players
OFK Beograd players
Yugoslav First League players
Serbian football managers
People from Ruma